The Guldbagge for Best Film is a Swedish film award presented annually by the Swedish Film Institute (SFI) as part of the Guldbagge Awards (Swedish: "Guldbaggen") to the best Swedish motion picture of the year.

Winners and nominees 
Each Guldbagge Awards ceremony is listed chronologically below along with the winner of the Guldbagge Award for Best Film and the producer associated with the award. Before 1991 the awards did not announce nominees, only winners. In the columns under the winner of each award are the other nominees for best film, which are listed from 1991 and forward.

For the first nineteen ceremonies, the eligibility period spanned two calendar years. For example, the 2nd Guldbagge Awards presented on 15 October 1965, recognized films that were released between July 1964 and June 1965. Starting with the 20th Guldbagge Awards, held in 1985, the period of eligibility became the full previous calendar year from 1 January to 31 December. The Awards presented at that ceremony were in respect of 18 months of film production owing to the changeover from the broken calendar year to the standard calendar year during 1984. Due to a mediocre film year, no awards ceremony was held in 1971.

1960s

1970s

1980s

1990s

2000s

2010s

2020s

See also 
 Academy Award for Best Picture
 BAFTA Award for Best Film
 Golden Globe Award for Best Motion Picture – Drama
 Golden Globe Award for Best Motion Picture – Musical or Comedy
 Screen Actors Guild Award for Outstanding Performance by a Cast in a Motion Picture
 Academy Award for Best Foreign Language Film (List of Academy Award winners and nominees for Best Foreign Language Film)
 Golden Globe Award for Best Foreign Language Film

Notes

References

External links 
  
  
 

Film
Awards for best film
Lists of films by award
Film